Longhena is the third full-length studio album by technical grindcore band Gridlink, released in 2014. It was the band's final release before entering hiatus later that year.

Track listing

Personnel

Gridlink
Matsubara - guitar
Patterson - bass guitar
Fajardo - drums
Chang - vocals

Session musicians
Joey Molinaro - violin
Paul Pavlovich (Alphanumeric, ex-Assück, ex-Track the Curse)- vocals on "Chalk Maple"

Production staff
James Plotkin - vinyl mastering
Kevin Antreassian - digital mastering, recording, mixing
Jon Chang - layout, art direction, photography
Stephen Ciucolli - photography
Nea Dune - model

References 

2014 albums
Gridlink albums